André Frey (7 November 1919 – 18 December 2002) was a French international footballer who played for Metz and Toulouse as a defender.

External links 
 
 
 Profile at FFF

1919 births
2002 deaths
French footballers
France international footballers
FC Metz players
Ligue 1 players
Association football defenders
Sportspeople from Moselle (department)
Toulouse FC (1937) players
Footballers from Grand Est